Dr. Andrew Honeycutt (born in Humboldt, Kansas) is an American educator. He is the Distinguished Professor of Business at Shorter University; previously to holding this position, he was a Nissan Marketing Fellow at  Northwestern University and was dean of business at two for-profit universities, Anaheim University and Argosy University. He is married to Deborah Honeycutt, MD.

References

Year of birth missing (living people)
Living people
People from Humboldt, Kansas
Georgia (U.S. state) Republicans
African-American educators
American educators
Boston University School of Management alumni
Harvard Business School alumni
Northwestern University fellows
21st-century African-American people